Pubertet ("Puberty") is a 1978 memoir by Swedish author Ivar Lo-Johansson. It won the Nordic Council's Literature Prize in 1979.

References

1978 non-fiction books
Swedish memoirs
Nordic Council's Literature Prize-winning works